Johann Karl Wilhelm Ferdinand Tiemann (June 10, 1848 – November 14, 1899) was a German chemist and together with Karl Reimer discoverer of the Reimer-Tiemann reaction.

Beginning in 1866, Tiemann studied pharmacy at the TU Braunschweig where he graduated in 1869. His professor in Brunswick wrote a letter of recommendation to August Wilhelm von Hofmann at the University of Berlin where Tiemann started as assistant of von Hofmann in 1869. In 1874 Wilhelm Haarmann and Tiemann started a company, after they discovered the synthesis of vanillin from coniferyl alcohol. The vanillin plant Holzminden was not very successful before Karl Reimer discovered the Reimer-Tiemann reaction which opened an alternative synthesis route to vanillin. In 1882 Tiemann became a professor at the University of Berlin.

He was involved in the first synthesis of Jonon a compound of the sweet violet (Viola odorata), which became a huge success for Harmann & Reimer company.

August Wilhelm von Hofmann married Berta the younger sister of Ferdinand Tiemann.

Works
 Tiemann-Gärtner's Handbuch der Untersuchung und Beurtheilung der Wässer : zum Gebrauch für Apotheker, Ärzte, Chemiker, Fabrikanten, Medicinalbeamte und Techniker ; mit 40 Holzstichen u. 10 Taf. . Vieweg, Braunschweig 4. Aufl. / bearb. von Georg Walter und August Gärtner 1895 Digital edition by the University and State Library Düsseldorf

1848 births
1899 deaths
19th-century German chemists
Technical University of Braunschweig alumni
Academic staff of the Humboldt University of Berlin
People from the Kingdom of Hanover